Beacon College is a private college in Leesburg, Florida. It was founded in 1989 and designed with curriculum and support services to serve students with dyslexia, ADHD, or other specific learning disabilities.

Beacon College offers Associate of Arts and Bachelor of Arts degrees. It is accredited by the Southern Association of Colleges and Schools and licensed by the Florida Department of Education.

History 
Led by learning-disabilities advocates Marsha Glines, and Patricia and Peter Latham, a group of parents incorporated Beacon College on May 24, 1989. At the time, the Florida Department of Education approved the college's plan to introduce a focused undergraduate curriculum aligned specifically to the specialized learning and support needs of students who learn differently. Beacon awards both Associate of Arts (A.A.) and Bachelor of Arts (B.A.) degrees.

In 2003, Beacon College earned full accreditation from the Southern Association of Colleges and Schools Commission on Colleges (SACSCOC).

References

External links

Liberal arts colleges in Florida
Learning disabilities
Dyslexia
Schools for people on the autistic spectrum
Speech disorders
Educational institutions established in 1989
1989 establishments in Florida
Autism-related organizations in the United States
Medical and health organizations based in Florida
Private universities and colleges in Connecticut